HD 204313 b is an extrasolar planet which orbits the G-type main sequence star HD 204313, located approximately 155 light years away in the constellation Capricorn. This planet orbits the star at a distance of 3.082 astronomical units and takes 1931 days or 5.29 years to revolve around the star. It has a minimum mass four times that of Jupiter. However the radius is not known since this planet was not detected by the transit method or direct imaging. Instead, this planet was detected by the radial velocity method using the CORALIE Echelle spectrograph mounted on the 1.2 meter Euler Swiss Telescope located at La Silla Observatory in Atacama desert, Chile on August 11, 2009.

The planet's existence was independently confirmed in 2015, and in 2022 its inclination and true mass were measured via astrometry.

References 

Exoplanets discovered in 2009
Giant planets
Capricornus (constellation)
Exoplanets detected by radial velocity
Exoplanets detected by astrometry